Sara bint Mashour Al Saud is a member of the Saudi royal family. She is the granddaughter of King Abdulaziz. She is married to her half-cousin, Crown Prince Mohammed bin Salman, son and heir of King Salman.

Biography
Sara bint Mashour is the daughter of Mashour bin Abdulaziz Al Saud and Noura bint Mohammed Saud Al Kabir. Her father is the son of King Abdulaziz and Nouf bint Nawaf bin Nuri Al Shaalan. Her mother, Noura, is the daughter of Mohammed bin Saud Al Kabir and granddaughter of Noura bint Abdul Rahman Al Saud and Saud Al Kabir.

Princess Sara married Prince Mohammed on 6 April 2008. They have five children, three boys and two girls: Prince Salman, Prince Mashour, Princess Fahda, Princess Noura and Prince Abdulaziz (born April 2021).

The first four were named after their grandparents, and the fifth one is named after his great-grandfather King Abdulaziz, the founder of Saudi Arabia.

According to Ali al-Ahmed of Institute for Gulf Affairs, based on the anonymous sources from the Al Saud family it was reported that Princess Sara had been subject to domestic violence since the early days of her marriage. Similar allegations were also mentioned in the book entitled Saudi Bodyguard by Mark Young who had worked for the family.

References

Sara
Sara
Spouses of national leaders
Sara
Living people
Year of birth missing (living people)